Tanchowk is a settlement in Lumle village development committee, Kaski District of Nepal. It is about 45 km northwest of Pokhara and on the way to Annapurna base camp.

Kaski District